Žalany is a municipality and village in Teplice District in the Ústí nad Labem Region of the Czech Republic. It has about 500 inhabitants.

Administrative parts
Villages of Černčice and Lelov are administrative parts of Žalany.

References

Villages in Teplice District
Populated places in Teplice District